DeRidder High School is a public high school in the city of DeRidder, Louisiana, United States. The 9-12 school is a part of the Beauregard Parish School Board.

School uniforms 
All students are required to wear school school uniforms. These consist of khaki pants, jeans, shorts or skirts with collared polo, plain dress shirt, plain turtlenecks or oxford shirts that are to be solid white, royal blue, navy, or black along. School sponsored tee's are also acceptable.

Athletics
DeRidder High athletics competes in the LHSAA.

Notable alumni
Mel Branch (1955), professional football player for the Dallas Texans (American Football League)
Deshazor Everett (2010), professional football player for the Washington Redskins
Michael Mayes (1984), professional football player for the New Orleans Saints and New York Jets

References

Buildings and structures in Beauregard Parish, Louisiana
Education in Beauregard Parish, Louisiana
Public high schools in Louisiana